Limb-sparing techniques, also known as limb-saving or limb-salvage techniques, are performed in order to preserve the look and function of limbs. Limb-sparing techniques are used to preserve limbs affected by trauma, arthritis, cancers such as high-grade bone sarcomas, and vascular conditions such as diabetic foot ulcers. As the techniques for chemotherapy, radiation, and diagnostic modalities improve, there has been a trend toward limb-sparing procedures to avoid amputation, which has been associated with a lower 5-year survival rate and cost-effectiveness compared to limb salvage in the long-run. There are many different types of limb-sparing techniques, including arthrodesis, arthroplasty, endoprosthetic reconstruction, various types of implants, rotationplasty, osseointegration limb replacement, fasciotomy, and revascularization.

Arthrodesis

Arthrodesis is the surgical immobilization of bones within a joint to promote fusion of the joint. Arthrodesis is performed most commonly on joints of the feet, hands, and spine. Arthrodesis can relieve pain from arthritis and fractures. This is accomplished through the use of orthobiologics such as allografts and autografts. Allografts are done by creating bone grafts from a donor bone bank, whereas autografts are bone grafts from other bones in a patient's body. Patient-reported outcomes following this procedure are typically positive in terms of long-term pain relief; however, the procedure also results in decreased range of motion.

Arthroplasty

Arthroplasty, otherwise known as joint replacement, is a surgical procedure which involves resurfacing, realignment, or removal of bone at a joint interface to restore the joint's function. Arthroplasty is often performed on hips, knees, shoulders, and ankles to improve range of motion and relieve pain from arthritis or trauma. Arthroplasty of the shoulder is one of the most common of these procedures, although it has only been widely used since 1955. Themistocles Gluck is thought to have created the first shoulder arthroplasty in the 1800s. Since Gluck never published any results or notes on the procedure, Jules-Emile Pean is credited with performing the first shoulder arthroplasty in 1893.

Implants

Alloprosthetic composites
Alloprosthetic composites are a combination of multiple limb-sparing techniques, namely allografts and prosthesis. Allografts are used to replace the bone that has been "resected" using arthroplasty techniques, and then prosthesis is used to support and strengthen the allografts. Alloprosthetic composites are flexible in that surgeons can adapt the implants for any situation.

Prosthetic implants
Prosthetic implants are used when sections of bone must be replaced and no further growth is expected. Implants are mostly made from metals, but the possibility of using ceramic material has been discussed among surgeons. Prosthetics can be temporary or permanent. Temporary implants remain in place until the bone has healed and are then removed. The temporary implants take most of the burden off of the fracture, causing the bone to become less dense. This can lead to re-fracturing of the bone after the implant is removed. The implants can also cause stress concentrations as a result of the material difference between the bone and the plate. With the permanent prostheses, a putty-like substance is injected into the implant site to keep the body, mainly the immune system, from fighting off the implant. This substance can deteriorate bony tissue and cause serious bone problems for the patient. Prosthetic limbs have been used for many years.

3D-printed implants
3D-printing leverages the power of computer rendering of advanced imaging to tailor implants to each patient, which can then be used to create a physical realization of that implant to use in that individual's surgery. 3D-printing of medical devices was first used in the 1990s for dental implants and custom prosthetics but has since been used for various bones and organs such as urinary bladders.

Rotationplasty

Rotationplasty, more commonly known as Van-Nes or Borggreve Rotation, is a limb-sparing medical procedure performed when a patient's leg is amputated at the knee. The ankle joint is then rotated 180 degrees and is attached to the former knee joint, becoming a new knee joint. This allows patients to have two fully functional feet, as opposed to losing one leg completely to amputation.

Reasons for rotationplasty
Originally, rotationplasty was performed to treat infections and tumors around the knee, especially osteosarcoma of the knee. While it is still being used to treat their complications, rotationplasty is also used to treat growing children who have been diagnosed with tumors around the knee. Rotationplasty is also performed on children with congenital femoral deficiencies, such as those that cause unstable hip joints or limb-length discrepancy of the femur. This procedure gives patients the ability to retain the use of both feet, allowing them to continue living an active lifestyle.

History of rotationplasty
Rotationplasty was first performed by Borggreve in the early 1900s on a 12-year-old boy with tuberculosis. However, the procedure was not well known until 1950. At that time, physician Van Nes reported the results of rotationplasty procedures and became well known for founding the procedure. Since then, many surgeons have performed modified versions of rotationplasty and have had great success.

Rotationplasty procedure
In the actual procedure, the bone affected by the tumor, as well as a small part of the healthy femur and occasionally tibia bone, is removed. The ankle joint is then turned 180 degrees and is reattached to the thigh. They are held together by plates and screws until they have healed naturally. The surgery can take anywhere from 6–10 hours, with a day or two in intensive care. The leg is kept in a cast for 6–12 weeks. After the leg has sufficiently healed, the leg can be fitted for a prosthetic.

Advantages and disadvantages of rotationplasty
In the same scenario, amputation would not leave a knee joint. Rotationplasty retains the use of a knee joint. Furthermore, it provides a better position for a prosthetic limb compared to amputation. As a result, children who have had rotationplasty can return to their previous activities such as playing sports and avoid undergoing additional surgeries throughout their lives. Rotationplasty is also durable and has been associated with enhanced quality of life and life contentment. Unfortunately, not every case turns out favorably. Rotationplasty can result in problems with blood supply to the leg, infection, nerve injuries, problems with bone healing, and fracture of the leg.

References

Surgical removal procedures